John Henry Royster Farm is a historic tobacco farm complex and national historic district located near Bullock, Granville County, North Carolina.  The farmhouse was built about 1860, and is a two-story, heavy timber frame dwelling.  It features Greek Revival and Gothic Revival style design elements patterned after regional architect Jacob W. Holt.  Also on the property are the contributing garage, corn crib, shed, dairy, smokehouse, chicken house, brooder house, a square notched log striphouse, two-square-notched log tobacco barns, a metal-sheathed log tobacco barn and a frame packhouse.

It was listed on the National Register of Historic Places in 1988.

References

Tobacco buildings in the United States
Farms on the National Register of Historic Places in North Carolina
Historic districts on the National Register of Historic Places in North Carolina
Gothic Revival architecture in North Carolina
Greek Revival houses in North Carolina
Houses completed in 1860
Houses in Granville County, North Carolina
National Register of Historic Places in Granville County, North Carolina